Davy Chou (born 13 August 1983) is a Cambodian-French filmmaker. He is the grandson of Van Chann, who mysteriously disappeared in 1969. Davy Chou only discovered in his teens that his grandfather had been one of Cambodia's leading film producers in the 1960s.

Davy Chou founded the production company Vycky Films in 2009, with Jean-Jacky Goldberg and Sylvain Decouvelaere.

Career

Twin Diamonds and the Golden Reawakening Exhibition
In 2009, Davy Chou created film workshops with six universities and 60 students, and helped to found a youth-driven filmmaking collective, Kon Khmer Koun Khmer (កុនខ្មែរ កូនខ្មែរ, Khmer Films Khmer Generations). He was the producer of a suspense film which was directed by the students, Twin Diamonds. After the suspense film, Davy and Kon Khmer Koun Khmer spearheaded the first film exhibition about films from the 1950s and '60s. Considered as the first 9-day festival of its kind, it screened 11 films from the period and exhibited film posters, photographs as well as biographies of the leading stars of the time at the Chinese House, a restored colonial building near Phnom Penh's port. Davy Chou also found out during his studies and research in Cambodia that between the 1950s and 1960s, more than 400 films were made.

Golden Slumbers
Between 2010 and 2011, he moved to Cambodia in search of surviving witnesses (professionals, spectators, buildings) of the golden age of Cambodian cinema between 1960 and 1975, and found out that nearly 400 films were destroyed or lost under the Khmer Rouge regime. He interviewed actress Dy Saveth and filmmakers Ly Bun Yim, Yvon Hem (who died on August 10, 2012) and Ly You Sreang.

The 100 minute documentary resulted from the memories of Cambodian veteran film makers and actresses/actors, and it was called Golden Slumbers (in French Le Sommeil d'Or; in Khmer, ដំណេក មាស, Dâmnek Meas). The documentary was released in theatres in France on September 19, 2012 and on DVD on April 3, 2012 and has been screened in many countries. Golden Slumbers brought back many memories of Cambodia's pre-Khmer Rouge film industry and inspired a youth-driven revival of 1960s and '70s cinephilia. In this film, Davy Chou explored Cambodia's cinematic heritage, and showed the struggle of the country's filmmakers as they weathered political turmoil, followed by critical-mass neglect of their work. Golden Slumbers was selected at many film festivals including Forum Berlinale 2012 and Busan International Film Festival 2011.

Memory Film Festival
In 2013, Davy Chou came back to curate and coordinate Asia's first heritage film festival in Phnom Penh. Chou's participation in the film industry in Cambodia is known for starting interest from a younger Cambodian generation of filmmakers and filmgoers.

Cambodia 2099 
Cambodia 2099 (2014) is a short movie taking place in Phnom Penh on Diamond Island, the country's pinnacle of modernity. Two friends tell each other about the dreams they had the night before. Cambodia 2099 was selected at Director's Fortnight 2014[ and won the Grand Prix of Festival du Film de Vendome 2014.

Diamond Island 
His debut narrative feature-length film Diamond Island was screened in the International Critics' Week section at the 2016 Cannes Film Festival and won the SACD Award.

The project had been developed through the TorinoFilmLab Framework programme in 2015.

Filmography
2006: Le Premier film de Davy Chou (short)
2008: Expired (short)
2009: The Twin Diamonds (featurette)
2012: Golden Slumbers (documentary)
2014: Cambodia 2099 (short, fiction)
2016: Diamond Island (feature-length)
2022: Return to Seoul (feature-length)

Awards and nominations

References

External links
 

1983 births
Living people
French documentary filmmakers
Cambodian film directors
People from Fontenay-aux-Roses
French film producers
French screenwriters